Brompton is an inner-northern suburb of Adelaide, South Australia in the City of Charles Sturt.

History
Brompton was established in June 1849 and quickly grew. By October of that year, two-thirds of the formerly "bare common ground [was] covered with substantial and genteel cottages, thriving shops and wells of excellent water."

Ovingham Post Office opened on 1 November 1879, was renamed Bowden in 1970 and Brompton in 1991.

Geography
The suburb lies between Torrens Road and the Grange/Outer Harbor railway line and is bordered by Torrens Road at its northern end.

Demographics

The 2016 Census by the Australian Bureau of Statistics counted 3,537 persons in Brompton on census night. Of these, 48.4% were male and 51.6% were female.

The majority of residents (60.4%) are of Australian birth, with other common census responses being China (5.7%), Greece (4.8%), England (3.3%), Vietnam (1.9%), and India (1.4). Additionally, people of Aboriginal and/or Torres Strait Islander descent made up 1.2% of the suburb

In terms of religious affiliation, 41.4% of residents attributed themselves to being irreligious, 15.8% attributed themselves to being Catholic, 8.5% attributed themselves to be Eastern Orthodox, and 6.1% attributed themselves to being Anglican. Within Brompton, 91.4% of the residents were employed, with the remaining 8.6% being unemployed.

Politics

Local government
Brompton is part of Hindmarsh Ward in the City of Charles Sturt local government area, being represented in that council by Labor members Paul Alexandrides and Craig Auricht.

State and federal
Brompton lies in the state electoral district of Croydon and the federal electoral division of Adelaide. The suburb is represented in the South Australian House of Assembly by Peter Malinauskas and federally by Steve Georganas.

Community
The local newspaper is the Weekly Times Messenger.

Community groups
The Bowden Brompton Community Centre is based at 19 Green Street, Brompton. Additionally, Brompton also contains the Adelaide Croatian Club.

Schools
Bowden Brompton Community School is located on Torrens Road and Immaculate Heart of Mary School	is located on East Street.

Facilities and attractions

Shopping and dining
The Hawker Street shopping and dining precinct, and the Brompton Hotel and the Excelsior Hotel are in the suburb.

Parks

There are several parks in Brompton, the largest of which is Josiah Mitton Reserve, between Wood Avenue and Burley Griffin Boulevard. The reserve includes the Hindmarsh Incinerator, designed by Walter Burley Griffin in 1935. Completed in 1936, it is one of his two buildings in SA listed as among the 120 nationally significant 20th-century buildings in South Australia, the other being the Thebarton Incinerator at Thebarton. Other notable parks within Brompton include Stormrage Reserve, Thomas Harkness Reserve, and Ethelbert Reserve.

Motorsport
From 1949 until 1979, Brompton was the home to the world-famous Rowley Park Speedway located on the corner of Torrens Road and Coglin Street. Rowley Park was a  dirt track speedway built in the old Brompton Brick Pits and operated 23 meetings per season (usually October to April) on Friday nights and was capable of holding over 10,000 spectators. The speedway hosted numerous Australian and South Australian speedway championships through its history. From 1954 until 1973, the speedway was promoted by leading Adelaide identity Kym Bonython who made Rowley Park 'the' place to be in Adelaide on a Friday night during summer. Rowley Park closed on 4 April 1979 and is now the site of the Kym Bonython housing estate.

In 1965, Rowley Park was the site of Australia's first Demolition derby.

Transportation

Roads
Brompton is primarily serviced by Torrens Road, which connects the suburb to Adelaide city centre. Hawker Street cuts through the centre of the suburb.

Many of the local streets were established in the 19th century. Consequently, roadways tend to be narrow and, with a small volume of traffic, quiet.

Public transport
Brompton is serviced by public transport run by the Adelaide Metro.

Trains
There is no train stop in Ridleyton but the Grange and Outer Harbor railway lines pass nearby. The closest station is Bowden. On the Gawler railway line the closest station is Ovingham.

Buses
The suburb is serviced by the following bus routes:
230 232
250, 251, 252
253, 254, N254

See also

 List of Adelaide suburbs

References

External links

Suburbs of Adelaide
Populated places established in 1849
1849 establishments in Australia